Kulob Airport or Kulyab Airport  is an airport serving Kulob, a city in the Khatlon province in Tajikistan.

Facilities

Airlines and destinations

, the airport currently offers no domestic flights, as all of its flights are international flights to Russia.

References

  Polyot-Sirena Flight schedule

External links

Airports in Tajikistan
Khatlon Region